Neil Morris, known professionally as Drmngnow (stylised in all caps), is an Aboriginal Australian rapper, dancer, artist, and actor.

Culture
A Yorta Yorta/Kaieltheban man, Morris' stage name is a contraction of the phrase "dreaming now", referring to the Aboriginal concept of  The Dreaming.

Music
He uses his music as to explore culture, community and country and provokes discussion and education around Australia's Indigenous history and future.

In November 2022, he collaborated with other First Nations artists Emma Donovan, Emily Wurramara, DOBBY, and Optamus to create a song in memory of Cassius Turvey, a Noongar-Yamatji boy who had died at the age of 15 the result of an assault by a random attacker when walking home from school in Perth, Western Australia. The song, titled "Forever 15", was played at Turvey's funeral on 18 November 2022 funeral and released three days later on 21 November 2022.

Discography

Singles

As lead artist

Other appearances

Awards and nominations

Music Victoria Awards
The Music Victoria Awards are an annual awards night celebrating Victorian music. They commenced in 2006.

! 
|-
| 2018
| Drmngnow
| Best Hip Hop Act
| 
|rowspan="7"|  
|-
|rowspan="4"| 2019
| Drmngnow
| Best Solo Artist
| 
|-
| Drmngnow
| Breakthrough Victorian Act
| 
|-
| Drmngnow
| Best Hip Hop Act
| 
|-
| Drmngnow
| The Archie Roach Foundation Award for Emerging Talent
| 
|-
|rowspan="2"| 2020
| Drmngnow
| Best Electronic Act
| 
|-
| Drmngnow
| Best Hip Hop Act
| 
|-
| 2021
| Drmngnow
| Best Hip Hop Act
| 
| 
|-

References

Australian male rappers
Indigenous Australian musicians
Living people
Year of birth missing (living people)